Katherine Plouffe (born September 15, 1992) is a Canadian basketball player for Tango Bourges Basket and the Canadian national team, where she participated at the 2014 FIBA World Championship.

She is the daughter of Laurie and Daryl Plouffe. She has four siblings; her twin sister, Michelle, played basketball for the University of Utah located in Salt Lake City, Utah, United States, and her older sister, Andrea, played basketball at the University of Washington located in Seattle, Washington.

Early years
Plouffe first started playing basketball in the second grade. She had older siblings who were often in the gym. She enjoyed being in the gym with her older siblings so she picked up the game at a young age.

Pan Am games 2015
Plouffe was a member of the Canada women's national basketball team which participated in basketball at the 2015 Pan American Games held in Toronto, Ontario July 10 to 26, 2015. Canada opened the preliminary rounds with an easy 101–38 win over Venezuela. The following day they beat Argentina 73–58. The final preliminary game was against Cuba; both teams were 2–0, so the winner would win the group. The game went down to the wire with Canada eking out a 71–68 win. Canada would face Brazil in the semifinal.

Everything seemed to go right in the semifinal game. Canada opened the game with an 11–2 run on seven consecutive points by Miranda Ayim. Miah-Marie Langlois contributed five assists. In the third quarter Canada strongly out rebounded Brazil and hit 69% of their field goals to score 33 points in the quarter. Lizanne Murphy and Nirra Fields hit three-pointers to help extend the lead to 68–39 at the end of three quarters. Canada continued to dominate in the fourth quarter with three-pointers by Kia Nurse and Kim Gaucher. Canada went on to win the game 91–63 to earn a spot in the gold-medal game against the USA.

The gold-medal game matched up the host team Canada against USA, in a sold out arena dominated by fans in red and white and waving the Canadian flag. The Canadian team, arm in arm, sang O Canada as the respective national anthems were played.

After trading baskets early the US edged out to a double-digit lead in the second quarter. However the Canadians, spurred on by the home crowd cheering, fought back and tied up the game at halftime. In the third quarter, it was Canada's time to shine as they outscore the US 26–15. The lead would reach as high as 18 points. The USA would fight back, but not all the way and Canada won the game and the gold-medal 81–73. It was Canada's first gold-medal in basketball in the Pan Am games. Nurse was the star for Canada with 33 points, hitting 11 of her 12 free-throw attempts in 10 of her 17 field-goal attempts including two of three three-pointers. Plouffe contributed two rebounds, one block and two points.

Marquette statistics

References

1992 births
Living people
Basketball people from Alberta
Basketball players at the 2015 Pan American Games
Basketball players at the 2016 Summer Olympics
Canadian expatriate basketball people in France
Canadian expatriate basketball people in the United States
Canadian women's basketball players
Forwards (basketball)
Marquette Golden Eagles women's basketball players
Olympic basketball players of Canada
Pan American Games gold medalists for Canada
Pan American Games medalists in basketball
Sportspeople from Edmonton
Medalists at the 2015 Pan American Games